Capitol Land Trust (CLT) is a 501(c)(3) non-profit conservation organization based in Olympia, Washington, United States. CLT was formed in 1987 by a group of citizens in South Puget Sound who were concerned about growth in the area.

Mission statement
Capitol Land Trust is dedicated to furthering collaborative and strategic conservation of southwest Washington’s essential natural areas.

External links
 Capitol Land Trust website

Land trusts in Washington (state)
Environmental organizations established in 1987
1987 establishments in Washington (state)